The Diep River is a river located in northern Limpopo Province, South Africa. It is a tributary of the Sand River (Polokwane).

The Diep is a seasonal river that originates about 12 km SSE of Polokwane and flows roughly northwards until it joins the Sand River, just 22 km northeast of the same town. The confluence is located right after the Turfloop River, its only significant tributary, joins its right bank.

See also 

 List of rivers of South Africa

References

External links
Limpopo WMA1

Rivers of Limpopo